The discography of American R&B recording artist Tamar Braxton consists of five studio albums, one extended play, twelve singles, seven guest appearances, and fifteen music videos.

Albums

Studio albums

Extended plays

Singles

Promotional singles

Other charted songs

Other appearances

Music videos

References

External links
 Official website

Discographies of American artists
Rhythm and blues discographies
Discography